Sverre Kile (born 17 May 1953) is a former freestyle and medley Norwegian swimmer. He was born in Bergen. He competed at the 1972 Summer Olympics in Munich.

References

1953 births
Living people
Sportspeople from Bergen
Norwegian male freestyle swimmers
Norwegian male medley swimmers
Olympic swimmers of Norway
Swimmers at the 1972 Summer Olympics
20th-century Norwegian people